Clodomiro Cortoni (22 June 1923 – 3 September 2000) was an Argentine cyclist. He competed at the 1948 and 1952 Summer Olympics.

References

External links
 

1923 births
2000 deaths
Argentine male cyclists
Olympic cyclists of Argentina
Cyclists at the 1948 Summer Olympics
Cyclists at the 1952 Summer Olympics
Pan American Games medalists in cycling
Pan American Games gold medalists for Argentina
Cyclists at the 1951 Pan American Games
Medalists at the 1951 Pan American Games
Sportspeople from Buenos Aires Province